Patricia Olive "Pat" Kavanagh (31 January 1940 – 20 October 2008) was a British literary agent.

Life and work
Kavanagh was born in 1940 in Durban, South Africa, where her father was a journalist before and after his service as a fighter pilot in the SAAF during the Second World War. Her mother, Olive (née Le Roux), was a pioneering public health inspector. Her half-sister, Julie Kavanagh, is a ballet critic. Her half-brother, Michael O'Brien, is a geologist living in Vancouver, British Columbia, Canada.

She attended the University of Cape Town, but pursued an interest in acting. She had an uncredited, non-speaking role in Dylan Thomas's Under Milk Wood after coming to Britain in 1964. She did not get paid for the part, but, as she later recalled, she did "get to snog Richard Burton". It marked the end of her acting career. While working for J. Walter Thompson as a copywriter, she answered an advertisement for a position as a literary agent. She was hired by "A. D. Peters, a legendary agent who showed her the ropes", taught her how to negotiate and gave her responsibility for selling serialization and newspaper rights for the agency's early group of clients, including Arthur Koestler, S. J. Perelman, Rebecca West and Tom Wolfe.

She was married to, and was the literary agent of, the writer Julian Barnes. They lived in North London. In the 1980s, Kavanagh left Barnes for a relationship with author Jeanette Winterson, author of Oranges Are Not the Only Fruit, but later returned to the marriage. Winterson is said to have used the relationship as the basis of her novel The Passion (1987).

Kavanagh became the agent in 1985 of Martin Amis, who left her after 23 years to "throw in his lot" with American agent Andrew Wylie, as part of an effort to get a large advance for his own novel The Information. In 2001, her employer, now known as Peters, Fraser & Dunlop, was purchased by CSS Stellar, a company specializing in sports marketing. Kavanagh was one of several former employees who left the company in September 2007 to form United Agents. Her clients left to join her at the new firm.

She died of a brain tumour on 20 October 2008 in London, aged 68, and was buried on the east side of Highgate Cemetery.

Clients
Her clients included:

 Sally Beauman
 Dirk Bogarde (Estate)
 Duncan Campbell
 Lindsay Clarke
 Wendy Cope
 Russell Davies
 Michael Dibdin
 Douglas Dunn
 James Fenton
 Sir Christopher Frayling
 Nicci and Sean French
 Simon Garfield
 Andrew Graham-Dixon
 Robert Harris
 John Irving
 Clive James
 Arthur Koestler (Estate)
 Dame Hermione Lee
 Laurie Lee (Estate)
 Prue Leith
 Adam Mars-Jones
 Brian Moore (Estate)
 Blake Morrison
 Sir Andrew Motion
 Chris Mullin
 John Preston
 Ruth Rendell
 Helen Simpson 
 Sandi Toksvig
 William Trevor, KBE
 Joanna Trollope (aka Caroline Harvey)
 Auberon Waugh (Estate)
 Francis Wheen
 Bee Wilson
 Jeanette Winterson

References

External links
Portrait with Kingsley Amis, npg.org.uk; accessed 6 June 2014.

1940 births
2008 deaths
Burials at Highgate Cemetery
Literary agents
Bisexual women
English bisexual people
South African bisexual people
Deaths from brain cancer in England
Neurological disease deaths in England
University of Cape Town alumni
British people of Irish descent
South African people of Irish descent
South African emigrants to the United Kingdom
20th-century South African LGBT people
20th-century English LGBT people